Jeremiah Fisayo Bambi is a Nigerian journalist, producer, news writer, news anchor and showhost on Africanews and Euronews.

Career
Bambi produces and presents "Inspire Africa", a TV programme with stories of innovation, change and impact in Africa.
He co-hosted the breakfast news programme "The Morning Call" on Africanews, a television news program on politics, culture, education, sciTech, sports and business.
He has interviewed government leaders like the former UK Prime Minister Gordon Brown on Britain's role in Nigeria's fight against Terrorism, and people from the public and private sector in business and policy making in Africa. He was a speaker at a conference at the African Summit.

Awards 
Bambi was a shortlisted candidate of the BBC Komla Dumor Award, and was a candidate for the Nigeria Achievers Awards 2020 TV personality of the year.

References

External links 

https://www.africanews.com/2023/03/04/south-africas-first-3d-printed-low-cost-house-inspire-africa//

Nigerian journalists
Living people
Year of birth missing (living people)